Pastel de Camiguín, (Camiguin Cake) or simply pastel, is a Filipino soft bun with yema (custard) filling originating from the province of Camiguin. The name is derived from Spanish pastel ("cake"). Pastel is an heirloom recipe originally conceived by Eleanor Popera Jose and the members of her family in Camiguin. She started to commercially sell it from 1990. It is primarily produced at the time of family's special occasions and gatherings.

In addition to the original yema filling, pastel also feature other fillings, including ube, mocha, macapuno, cheese, chocolate, durian, jackfruit, and mango, among others. Pastel is regarded as a pasalubong (regional specialty gifts) of Camiguin Island and nearby Cagayan de Oro.

See also
 Yema ce
Pan de siosa
Mamón
Pastillas
Leche flan

References

Sweet breads
Culture of Camiguin
Philippine breads
Philippine desserts
Visayan cuisine
Southeast Asian breads